Something Wicked is a 2017 Nigerian movie co-produced by Okey Uzoeshi and Isioma Osaje and directed by Yemi Morafa under the production companies of Jack of Aces, Agency 106, Film Boyz and FilmOne Distribution.   The movie stars Gabriel Afolayan, Iretiola Doyle, Ivie Okujaye-Egboh, Adesua Etomi, Beverly Naya and Okey Uzoeshi.

Synopsis 
The movie revolves around a widow and her orphaned nephew. While her nephew who moved into her house is having difficulty in coping with the new family, she is having difficulty in maintaining her business and single parenthood.

Premiere 
The movie was premiered across cinemas in the country on February 17, 2017.

Cast 
Ireti Doyle
Okey Uzoeshi
Gabriel Afolayan
Beverly Naya
Ivie Okujaye
Adesua Etomi
Omawumi Dada
Bisola Aiyeola
Timini Egbuson.

References 

2017 films
Nigerian drama films
English-language Nigerian films